Hracholusky is a municipality and village in Prachatice District in the South Bohemian Region of the Czech Republic. It has about 500 inhabitants.

Administrative parts
Villages of Obora, Vrbice and Žitná are administrative parts of Hracholusky.

References

Villages in Prachatice District